Liebezeit is a surname of German origin. Notable people with the surname include:

 Jaki Liebezeit (1938–2017), German drummer, founding member of Can
 Karl-Heinz von Liebezeit (born 1960), German television actor

Surnames of German origin